LRC (short for LyRiCs) is a computer file format that synchronizes song lyrics with an audio file, such as MP3, Vorbis or  MIDI. When an audio file is played with certain music players on a computer or on modern digital audio players, the song lyrics are displayed. The lyrics file generally has the same name as the audio file, with a different filename extension. For example, song.mp3 and song.lrc. The LRC format is text-based and similar to subtitle files.

Formats

Simple format 
Simple LRC format was introduced by Taiwan-based Kuo (Djohan) Shiang-shiang's Lyrics Displayer. It was one of the first programs, if not the first, that attempted to simulate Karaoke performance. It usually displays a whole line of lyrics, but it is possible to display a word at a time, such as one would see in modern Karaoke machines, by creating a time tag for each word rather than each line. Kuo's Lyrics Displayer was created in 1998 and was accompanied with a plug-in for Winamp.

The Line Time Tags are in the format [mm:ss.xx] where mm is minutes, ss is seconds and xx is hundredths of a second.

 Normal example:

 [00:12.00]Line 1 lyrics
 [00:17.20]Line 2 lyrics
 [00:21.10]Line 3 lyrics
 ...
 [mm:ss.xx]last lyrics line

ID tags may appear before the lyrics, although some players may not recognize or simply ignore this. 

 [ar:Lyrics artist]
 [al:Album where the song is from]
 [ti:Lyrics (song) title]
 [au:Creator of the Songtext]
 [length:How long the song is]
 [by:Creator of the LRC file]
 [offset:+/- Overall timestamp adjustment in milliseconds, + shifts time up, - shifts down] 
 [re:The player or editor that created the LRC file]
 [ve:version of program]

 Example with ID tags:

 [ar:Chubby Checker oppure  Beatles, The]
 [al:Hits Of The 60's - Vol. 2 – Oldies]
 [ti:Let's Twist Again]
 [au:Written by Kal Mann / Dave Appell, 1961]
 [length: 2:23]
 
 [00:12.00]Naku Penda Piya-Naku Taka Piya-Mpenziwe
 [00:15.30]Some more lyrics ...
 ...

Simple format extended 
Available only in Walaoke from Walasoft.  The ability to change and specify the gender of the lyrics by using M: Male, F: Female, D: Duet.
 Example:
 [00:12.00]Line 1 lyrics
 [00:17.20]F: Line 2 lyrics
 [00:21.10]M: Line 3 lyrics
 [00:24.00]Line 4 lyrics
 [00:28.25]D: Line 5 lyrics
 [00:29.02]Line 6 lyrics

Let's say we use blue for male, red for female and pink for Duet.
Line 1 using the default color (blue) when no tag is found.
Line 2 lyrics start with red when F: is found.
Line 3 lyrics start with blue when M: is found.
Line 4 lyrics stays blue when no tag is found.
Line 5 lyrics start with pink when D: is found.
Line 6 lyrics stays pink when no tag is found.

Enhanced format 
Enhanced LRC format is an extension of Simple LRC Format developed by the designer of A2 Media Player.

The differences:

 The line timestamp is the end of the previous word.
 This allows LRC players to determine the duration of the previous word, and when to display the next line.
 Adds a Word Time Tag in the format: <mm:ss.xx>.

Format example:

 [mm:ss.xx] <mm:ss.xx> line 1 word 1 <mm:ss.xx> line 1 word 2 <mm:ss.xx> ... line 1 last word <mm:ss.xx>
 [mm:ss.xx] <mm:ss.xx> line 2 word 1 <mm:ss.xx> line 2 word 2 <mm:ss.xx> ... line 2 last word <mm:ss.xx>
 ...
 [mm:ss.xx] <mm:ss.xx> last line word 1 <mm:ss.xx> last line word 2 <mm:ss.xx> ...  last line last word <mm:ss.xx>
Example of an Enhanced LRC file:
 [ar: Jefferson Airplane]
 [al: Surrealistic Pillow]
 [au: Jefferson Airplane]
 [length: 2:58]
 [by: lrc-maker]
 [ti: Somebody to Love]
 
 [00:00.00] <00:00.04> When <00:00.16> the <00:00.82> truth <00:01.29> is <00:01.63> found <00:03.09> to <00:03.37> be <00:05.92> lies 
 [00:06.47] <00:07.67> And <00:07.94> all <00:08.36> the <00:08.63> joy <00:10.28> within <00:10.53> you <00:13.09> dies 
 [00:13.34] <00:14.32> Don't <00:14.73> you <00:15.14> want <00:15.57> somebody <00:16.09> to <00:16.46> love

Support

Hardware or OEM Software 
 Huawei's Standard Music Player
 Samsung's Standard Music Player
 Xiaomi's Standard Music Player
 Meizu's M3 Music Card and M6 Mini Player
 Creative Labs' MuVo V100
 Archos 5, when LRC file found with the same name as the song
 Rockbox compatible devices. See Manual entry
 Nokia's Symbian devices: "Music Player with lyrics available for selected software versions of Nokia 5800XM, X6 and 5230"
 Sony NWZ-E350 Series/E450 Series/E460 Series/E470 Series/A15/A17 Walkman; Sony Tablet S (With an embedded music player based on Android)
 Caanoo, when LRC file found with the same name as the song
 GP2X Wiz, when LRC file found with the same name as the song
 TEAC MP-222, when LRC file found with the same name as the song
 Transcend's MP330, when LRC file found with the same name as the song
 Cocktail Audio X40, X50 when LRC file found with the same name as the song

Software 
Modern Applications
 Musicolet Music Player for Android (supports Creating and Viewing synchronized lyrics in LRC format) 
Akari's LRC Maker (open-source online simple LRC maker/editor) (GitHub link)
LyricsX (open-source, MacOS App Store approved application to view lyrics on screen and/or Touch Bar of MacBooks) (App Store link) (GitHub link)
LRC Maker (online simple and enhanced LRC maker/editor)
KaraFun Player (a third-party application that can visualise both simple and enhanced lrc files)
Other
Tauon Music Box (for Linux)
 Sony Media Go (for Windows 10, 8, 7, Vista, and XP, Create and edit lyrics)
 K-Multimedia Player
 lrcShow-X (free software for X Window System, uses D-Bus to communicate with audio player)
 MiniLyrics (for Windows, Mac OS X & Android, own a large LRC database)
 StepMania
 OSD Lyrics (for Linux)
 Kodi (up to v15) / Boxee
 Plex (software)
 Foobar2000 (with foo_uie_lyrics component)
 Mediabox (for Nokia Maemo)
 ptlyrics (for Palm OS)
 MusicBee
 LineSpec  displays lyrics in combination with a few media players
 YouTube Movie Maker (can make lyric videos)
 Lyrimer 
 Neutron Player for Android Mobile Devices
 AutoLyric
 AIMP (with WebLyrics v0.2 Preview and MyClouds plugin)
 Retro Music Player
Medoly (for Android, also supports Enhanced LRC formats and other lyric formats)
LRCMakerPro for Android Devices
Vanilla Music (with Lyrics search plugin)
 OneStagePlayer 
 mpv
 Poweramp (beta)

See also 
 Karaoke and *.kar files.
 CD+G
 MP3+G
 Timed Text
 LrcGenerator

References 

Subtitle file formats
Lyrics